The Benalla Tungamah Football League (TBFL) was established in May, 1938, from the following North Eastern Victoria, Australian rules football clubs – Benalla, Devenish, Katamatite, St. James, Tungamah and Yabba – Dookie.

History
The Benalla Tungamah Football League (BTFL) was established in May, 1938, from the following North Eastern Victorian, Australian rules football clubs – Benalla, Devenish, Katamatite, St. James, Tungamah and Yabba – Dookie.

This newly formed league came about when Mulwala Football Club left the Benalla Mulwala Football League to join the Coreen & District Football League in 1938.

The BTFL went into recess from 1940 to 1947 due to World War II and was reformed in March, 1948.

In 1951, 12 teams competed in the BTFL.

Benalla made six grand finals in their seven years in the BTFL, winning three premierships, before Benalla and Wangaratta reserves sides both entered the Ovens and Murray Football League's newly formed seconds competition in 1953.

The BTFL changed its name to the Tungamah Football League in 1967.

In 1996, the league changed its name to the Goulburn Valley Football League – Division Two competition. The GVFL absorbed the clubs from the Tungamah Football League and had a second division for three years (1996–1998).

Then in 1999, the league's name was changed to the Central Goulburn Football Netball League, which lasted until 2005, when club's went into other competitions under the demise of the VCFL. The CGFNL had four grades of football – Seniors, Reserves, Under 17's and Under 14's, plus five grades of netball – A, B, B Reserve, D & E Grade.

The Lawless family donated a medal to the senior football best and fairest winners from 1954 to 2005, across the four different football league names.

Interestingly, Alexandra's George Steiner won three league best and fairest Lawless Medals, one in each of the following – Tungamah Football League – 1994, Goulburn Valley – Division Two – 1996 and Central Goulburn Football League – 2000.

Clubs

Benalla Tungamah Football League (1938 to 1966)

 Benalla Seniors: 1938 & 1939. Joined the Goulburn Valley Football League in 1940.
 Benalla Reserves: 1948 to 1952. Joined the Ovens & Murray Football League in 1953. 
 Congupna: 1962 to 1966
 Devenish: 1938 to 1952. Joined the Benalla & District Football League in 1953. 
 Dookie: 1949 to 1966
 Dookie College: 1953 to 1966
 Dookie Yabba: 1938 & 1939. Joined the Goulburn Valley Football Association in 1940.
 Invergordon 1952
 Katamatite: 1938 & 1939, 1956 to 1966
 Katrandra: 1953 to 1966
 Mulwala: 1949 to 1966
 North Wangaratta: 1951 & 1952. Joined the Benalla & District Football League in 1953. 
 St. James: 1938 to 1955. Merged with Devenish to form Devenish United FC & entered the Benalla & District Football League in 1955. 
 Tungamah: 1938 to 1966
 Violet Town: 1950 to 1966
 Wangaratta Reserves: 1949 to 1952. Joined the Ovens & Murray Football League in 1953. 
 Wilby: 1951 to 1966

Tungamah Football League (1967 to 1995)

 Alexandra: 1986 to 1995
 Benalla All Blacks: 1981 to 1995
 Congupna: 1967 to 1995
 Dookie: 1967 to 1976. Merged with Dookie College to form Dookie United in 1977. 
 Dookie College: 1967 to 1976. Merged with Dookie to form Dookie United in 1977. 
 Dookie United: 1977 to 1995
 Katamatite: 1967 to 1994. Joined the Picola & District Football League in 1995. 
 Katrandra: 1967 to 1995. Joined the Picola & District Football League in 1996.
 Mansfield: 1977 to 1995
 Mulwala: 1967 to 1986. Joined the Murray Football League in 1987.
 Shepparton East: 1968 to 1995
 Thornton Eildon: 1995
 Tungamah: 1967 to 1994. Joined the Picola & District Football League in 1995. 
 Violet Town: 1967 to 1977. Joined the Benalla & District Football League in 1978.
 Wilby: 1967 to 1970. Wilby FC folds up after the 1970 season.

Goulburn Valley Football League – Division Two (1996 to 1998)

 Alexandra: 1996 to 1998
 Benalla All Blacks: 1996 to 1998
 Congupna: 1996 only. Joined the Murray Football League in 1997.
 Dookie United: 1996 to 1998
 Mansfield: 1996 & 1997. Entered the GVFNL – Division One in 1998.
 Rumbalara: 1997 & 1998
 Shepparton East: 1996 to 1998
 Thornton Eildon: 1996 to 1998
 Violet Town: 1996 to 1998
 Yea: 1998

Central Goulburn Football League (1999 to 2005)

 Alexandra: 1999 to 2005. Re-joined the Yarra Valley Mountain District Football League in 2006.
 Benalla All Blacks: 1999 to 2004. Entered the Ovens & King Football League in 2005.
 Dookie United: 1999 to 2005. Joined the Picola & District Football League in 2006. 
 Rumbalara: 1999 to 2005. Joined the Murray Football League in 2006.
 Shepparton East: 1999 to 2005. Joined the Picola & District Football League in 2006.
 Thornton Eildon: 1999 to 2005. Re-joined the Yarra Valley Mountain District Football League in 2006.
 Violet Town: 1999 to 2005. Joined the Kyabram & District Football League in 2006.
 Yea: 1999 to 2005. Played in the Kyabram & District Football League in 2006 and 2007, then joined the Yarra Valley Mountain District Football League in 2008.

Honourboard

Benalla – Tungamah Football League 
 1938 to 1966.
 Senior Football

Tungamah Football League 
1967 to 1995

Goulburn Valley Football League Division Two
1996 to 1998

Central Goulburn Football League
1999 to 2005

() - Brackets includes goals kicked in finals.

Tungamah Football League 
 Reserves Grand Finals

Tungamah Football League 
 Thirds / Under 17's Grand Finals
  

Tungamah Football League 
 Fourths / Under 12's Grand Finals

Senior Football Best & Fairest Awards
Benalla Tungamah Football League
 1938 to 1966
 The Lawless Family Medal
The Lawless Family Medal for the BTFL senior football best and fairest award was first donated in 1954, by John J. Lawless – Senior, with the winner receiving a canteen of cutlery.

Tungamah Football League
 1967 to 1995
 The Lawless Family Medal

Goulburn Valley Football League – Division Two
 1996 to 1998
 The Lawless Family Medal

Central Goulburn Football League
 1999 to 2005
 The Lawless Family Medal

External links
 Tungamah Football League
 Tungamah Football League - Clubs & Premiership List
 It's all over for Central Goulburn FNL. August, 2005
 1967 Tungamah Football League Premiers: Wilby FC team photo
 2005 - Last year of the Central Goulburn FNL

References

1938 establishments in Australia
Sports leagues established in 1938
Defunct Australian rules football competitions in Victoria (Australia)